The Kapp Hanna Formation is a geologic formation in Norway. It preserves fossils dating back to the Carboniferous period.

See also

 List of fossiliferous stratigraphic units in Norway

References

 

Carboniferous System of Europe
Carboniferous Norway